Cosmopterix zathea is a moth in the  family Cosmopterigidae. It is found in India (Coorg).

References

Natural History Museum Lepidoptera generic names catalog

zathea